National Bonds is a savings and investment company in the UAE. It is a private joint-stock shareholding company, established in March 2006. It is owned by The Investment Corporation of Dubai. National Bonds is Shari’a compliant and regulated financial institution.

See also 
Economy of the United Arab Emirates

References

External links 
 Website

Finance in the United Arab Emirates
Investment in the United Arab Emirates